Chrobry Embankment (Polish: Wały Chrobrego), previously known as Haken Terrace (German: Hakenterrasse; Polish: Taras Hakena, Tarasy Hakena), is an observation deck in Szczecin, Poland. Located on an escarpment along the Oder river, it is 500 metre (546.8 yard) long and, together with the National Museum, Ducal Castle and Cathedral Basilica of St James the Apostle, it forms an urban and architectural plan.

It was designed and constructed under the supervision of Wilhelm Meyer-Schwartau between 1902 and 1921. It was commissioned by the city mayor, Hermann Haken, after whom it was originally named following his death. After the city was transferred to Poland at the end of World War II, the observation deck was renamed after Bolesław I the Brave, a duke of the Duchy of Poland and later a king of the Kingdom of Poland, known in Polish as Bolesław Chrobry.

References

Bibliography 
 Encyklopedia Szczecina, 2nd volume, University of Szczecin, 2000, pages 585–587. . (in Polish)
 Szczecin – Łasztownia, N-33-90-C-a-4, Główny Geodeta Kraju, Warsaw, 2002, page 1, series: Mapa topograficzna Polski 1:10 000. .  (in Polish)
 NID: Register of immovable monuments. 2013 [access date: 2013-09-10].

Boulevards
History of Szczecin
Buildings and structures in Szczecin
Tourist attractions in West Pomeranian Voivodeship
Old Town, Szczecin